HMS Lark was a schooner of the Royal Navy, built by Westacott’s, Barnstaple and launched on 4 December 1880.

Commenced service on the Australia Station in 1882. She undertook survey work in the Bougainville Strait, Choisel Bay and San Cristobel Island. During her life the ship's surgeon on board was Henry B. Guppy who also did much scientific research during the journeys.

In 1883 Lark under C. F. Oldham transported the crew of the barque Illie which was wrecked in the Solomon Islands to Brisbane. She sold at Sydney in December 1887.

Based in Hobart, she was sold again in 1888 and was used as a coastal commercial trader in the Solomon Islands based out of Sydney.

Citations

References
Bastock, John (1988), Ships on the Australia Station, Child & Associates Publishing Pty Ltd; Frenchs Forest, Australia.

External links
 

1880 ships
Ships built in Devon
Schooners of the Royal Navy